Bulbine caput-medusae is a species of plant in the Asphodelaceae family. It is endemic to Namibia.  Its natural habitats are dry savanna and hot deserts.

References

Flora of Namibia
caputmedusae
Least concern plants
Taxonomy articles created by Polbot